The Canadian Flowers for Food Society (Flowers for Food) is a non-profit organisation started in 2005 in Vancouver, BC, Canada by Marrett Green. Flowers for Food collects floral discards from major flower growers and distributors in the Vancouver area and delivers them to other charitable programs, services, and homeless persons, who in turn market them streetside for donations. Flowers for Food is a registered Canadian charity under paragraph 149(1)(f) of the Income Tax Act and is also a registered BC Society (BN: 84141 0756 RC001).

Composting project 

Flowers for Food also has a composting project.  This non-profit venture was designed to divert organic floral waste from Greater Vancouver Regional District landfills to composting stations that are managed by Flowers for Food volunteers and their paid associates.  Finished compost is sold to the public.

See also 

 Poverty reduction
 Homelessness in Canada

References

External links 

 Flowers for Food website

Charities based in Canada
Poverty in Canada
Homelessness in Canada